The Chesapeake & Ohio Railway No. 1308 is an articulated 2-6-6-2 "Mallet" type steam locomotive built by Baldwin Locomotive Works in 1949. It was the next to the last Class 1 mainline locomotive built by Baldwin, closing out more than 100 years of production, a total of more than 70,000 locomotives. Its other surviving sister locomotive, No. 1309, has been restored to operation at the Western Maryland Scenic Railroad in Cumberland, Maryland.

History
While the engine was built in the 1943, it was among the last of a series of 2-6-6-2s that the C&O used, starting in 1911.  A very similar design, the USRA 2-6-6-2 was chosen by the United States Railroad Administration as one of its standard designs thirty years earlier during World War I.  The advantage of the design was that it could be used on the relatively light, tightly curved, branch lines in West Virginia and Kentucky coal country, and that's where it worked for its seven-year working life, making the two-hour run from Peach Creek, near Logan, West Virginia to the Ohio River at Russell, Kentucky with an occasional trip to Hinton, West Virginia. Its use in heavy mountain railroading is emphasized by its two cross compound air compressors mounted on the smokebox door to supply enough air for frequent heavy braking.

The class was unusual for the time in that they were true Mallets, since their steam was expanded once in their smaller rear cylinders and then a second time in their larger front cylinders. While compound locomotives are more efficient than single expansion, their extra complication led to very few United States railroads using them after the turn of the century. The C&O had a long history with Mallets and they were ideal for slow speed work in West Virginia.

After its last run on February 29, 1956, it was stored at Russell until the C&O gave it to the Collis P. Huntington Railroad Historical Society, Inc., a group founded in 1959. Collis P. Huntington is best known as one of the Big Four who built the Central Pacific Railroad from San Francisco to Promontory, Utah, but following that he spent at least ten years as a leading figure of the C&O. The town where 1308 sits is named for him. The C&O donated the engine to the New River Train Group in 1962 as has been on since been on static display at the Collis P. Huntington Railroad Historical Society, Inc.

The locomotive was added to the National Register of Historic Places as Chesapeake and Ohio 1308 Steam Locomotive in 2003.

References

National Register of Historic Places in Cabell County, West Virginia
Railway locomotives introduced in 1949
Railway locomotives on the National Register of Historic Places
Rail transportation on the National Register of Historic Places in West Virginia
2-6-6-2 locomotives
Baldwin locomotives
Individual locomotives of the United States
1308
Mallet locomotives
Standard gauge locomotives of the United States
Preserved steam locomotives of West Virginia